Bridget Collins (born 1981) is a British author of adult and young adult fiction.

Collins was born in 1981 in Kent, England. She earned a degree in English at King's College, Cambridge, then trained as an actor at the London Academy of Music and Dramatic Art, and started her first novel when she was not working.

She has written seven young adult titles as B. R. Collins. Her first, The Traitor Game, won the 2009 Branford Boase Award.

Her first adult novel  was published in 2019, and was shortlisted for Waterstones Book of the Year.

Young adult titles
The Traitor Game (2008)

Adult fiction
The Binding, 2019
The Betrayals, 2020

References

External links

Living people
British writers of young adult literature
1981 births
King's College, Cambridge
Alumni of the London Academy of Music and Dramatic Art
People from Kent
21st-century English women writers
21st-century English novelists